The 2005–06 Ivy League men's basketball season was the Ivy League's 52nd season of basketball. The team with the best record (Penn Quakers) progressed to play in the 2006 NCAA Division I men's basketball tournament. Ibrahim Jaaber, who played point guard for the Penn Quakers, won the Ivy League Men's Basketball Player of the Year. He averaged 18.2 points, 3.4 rebounds, 3.3 steals, and 2.2 assists.

Standings

References